Reid Ridge is a narrow rock ridge at the west side of the mouth of Cambridge Glacier in Victoria Land. Named by Advisory Committee on Antarctic Names (US-ACAN) in 1964 for John R. Reid, Jr., glaciologist at Little America V in 1959–60.
 

Ridges of Victoria Land
Scott Coast